Koninklijke VolkerWessels B.V. is a major European construction services business with Dutch-based headquarters. It is owned by the Wessels Family through Reggeborgh Holding.

History
The company was founded by Adriaan Volker in Sliedrecht in 1854. It merged with Stevin Groep to form Volker Stevin in 1978 and with Kondor Wessels in 1997 to form Volker Wessels Stevin. It was rebranded VolkerWessels in 2002.

Operations
The company is organised into the following divisions:
 Building and property development
 Infrastructure
 VolkerWessels UK
 VolkerWessels Canada
 Energy, infrastructure technology and telecoms
 Supplies and marine services

The company is the eponymous sponsor of the VolkerWessels Cycling Team.

Major projects
Major projects undertaken by the company include the Eastern Scheldt storm surge barrier completed in 1986, the Gateshead Millennium Bridge completed in 2001 and the Euroborg soccer stadium for FC Groningen in Groningen completed in 2006.

VolkerWessels is also involved in HS2 lot C1, working as part of joint venture, due to complete in 2031.

References

External links
Official site

Construction and civil engineering companies of the Netherlands
Construction and civil engineering companies  established in 1854
Dutch companies established in 1854